Saheed Aderinto (born January 22, 1979) is a Nigerian-American Professor of History and African and African Diaspora Studies at Florida International University and an award-winning author. He is the Founding President of the Lagos Studies Association. In February 2023, Aderinto received the $300,000 Dan David Prize–the largest financial reward for excellence in the historical discipline in the world. He has published eight books, thirty-six journal articles and book chapters, forty encyclopedia articles, and twenty book reviews.

Biography 
Aderinto was born in Ibadan (Nigeria) on January 22, 1979. He completed his elementary school education at Adeen International School in 1990 and secondary school at Ibadan City Academy in 1996. He then went on to earn a BA in History from the University of Ibadan in 2004. Aderinto moved to the United States in 2005 to study at the University of Texas at Austin, where he received his MA and PhD in 2007 and 2010, respectively. In Fall of 2010, he started his teaching career at Western Carolina University, Cullowhee NC. In Fall 2022, Aderinto started a new position as Professor of History and African and African Diaspora Studies at Florida International University.

Scholarship 

Aderinto is influenced by a "total" approach to historical research. Instead of locating historical ideas or events solely within a specific branch of history (such as social, political or economic), Aderinto adopts a holistic approach that borrows vocabulary, methodology, and discursive tools from a wide-range of disciplines and sub-disciplines. He is driven by ideas that do not "over-compartmentalize" history but connect diverse strands of knowledge in understanding the past. From works on children and sexuality to guns and animals, he has expanded the frontiers of Nigerian history, disturbing disciplinary boundaries in meaningful ways.

Aderinto's publications conform to the research agenda of the "Third Wave of Historical Scholarship on Nigeria." Scholars of this era of Nigerian history, as he demonstrated in one of his books with a similar title, are ideologically motivated by the need to show the importance of history to contemporary Nigeria. Aderinto is drawn to themes like sexuality, which his predecessors hesitated to write about and under-researched populations like children, placing their experience at the center of colonial discourse of modernity. Furthermore, he challenges the rigid binary between colonial and postcolonial ideas by demonstrating that historical periods should not be treated with undue rigidity; rather historians should recognize the continuity and change in core structures and processes that produced them. Aderinto is definitely not the first historian to articulate the need to connect precolonial, colonial, and postcolonial Nigerian history to form a holistic thread of ideas. However, he is one of the few scholars putting this into practice by devoting carefully written epilogues focusing on postcolonial period to books on the colonial period—while also providing a separate chapter on the precolonial period. Aderinto's scholarship on love, romantic passion, and emotions, stand at the crossroads of gender, race, social class, and power formation across time and space.	

Aderinto is the author of When Sex Threatened the State: Illicit Sexuality, Nationalism, and Politics in Colonial Nigeria, 1900–1958 (University of Illinois Press, 2015) winner of the 2016 Nigerian Studies Association’s Book Award Prize for the “most important scholarly book/work on Nigeria published in English language.” The book examines "the intersection of sex work and the imperial project in British Nigeria." It has been described as "The first comprehensive history of sexuality of colonial Nigeria." It "combines the study of a colonial demimonde with an urban history of Lagos and a look at government policy to reappraise the history of Nigerian public life." Another critic thought that "Saheed Aderinto has produced a very important contribution to African social history and Nigerian historiography ''When Sex Threatened the State has been reviewed in more than a dozen journals, including the Canadian Journal of African Studies, American Historical Review, International Journal of African Historical Studies, Africa: the Journal of the International African Institute, Canadian Journal of History, Journal of the History of Sexuality, Journal of West African History, the Historian, and Journal of Colonialism and Colonial History, among others.

He is also the author of Guns and Society in Colonial Nigeria: Firearms, Culture, and Public Order (Indiana University Press, 2018). The book examines the evolution of Nigeria into a gun society during the first half of the twentieth century. In this book, Aderinto details the complex interactions between Nigerians and guns as a significant element of African colonial encounter.

Aderinto is the first and only Nigerian to be awarded the prestigious Dan David Prize. Announcing the winners in February 2023, the selection committee lauded Aderinto’s work for "situating African history at the cutting edge of diverse literatures in the histories of sexuality, nonhumans, and violence, noting that it is exceptional to see a single person leading scholarship in all of these fields."

Lagos Studies Association 
The history of the Lagos Studies Association dates back to May 2016 when Aderinto co-organized a conference on Lagos with Abosede George (Barnard College) and Ademide Adelusi-Adeluyi (University of California, Riverside) at Barnard College, New York City. Participants at the conference noted the significance of having an organization to harmonize the works of academic and non-academic practitioners of Lagos. They suggested the formation of the LSA. In spring of 2017, Aderinto led the establishment of the LSA as "an international, interdisciplinary organization of academic and non-academic practitioners whose interest focus on Lagos and its peoples." The LSA organizes the annual Lagos Conference held in Lagos (Nigeria) and holds panels at international conferences of the African Studies Association of the United States and the African Studies Association of the United Kingdom.

Publications  
Aderinto has published eight books, thirty-six journal articles and book chapters, forty encyclopedia articles, and twenty book reviews.

• Animality and Colonial Subjecthood in Africa: The Human and Nonhuman Creatures of Nigeria (Ohio University Press/New African Histories Series, 2022).

• Sports in African History, Politics, and Identity Formation (New York: Routledge, April 2019), co-edited with Michael Gennaro.

• Guns and Society in Colonial Nigeria: Firearms, Culture, and Public Order (Indiana University Press, January 2018)  0253031613.

• African Kingdoms: An Encyclopedia of Empires and Civilizations (Santa Barbara, CA: ABC-CLIO, 2017), edited 1610695798.
 
• When Sex Threatened the State: Illicit Sexuality, Nationalism, and Politics in Colonial Nigeria, 1900–1958 (University of Illinois Press, 2015) 0252080424.

• Children and Childhood in Colonial Nigerian Histories (New York: Palgrave Macmillan, 2015), edited 1137501626.

• The Third Wave of Historical Scholarship on Nigeria: Essays in Honor of Ayodeji Olukoju (Cambridge Scholars Publishing, 2012), co-edited 1443839949.

• Nigeria, Nationalism, and Writing History (University of Rochester Press, 2010), co-authored 1580463584.

Notable journal articles 
• “Empire Day in Africa: Patriotic Colonial Childhood, Imperial Spectacle, and Nationalism in Nigeria, 1905-1960,” Journal of Imperial and Commonwealth History 46 (2018) https://doi.org/10.1080/03086534.2018.1452538

• "Journey to Work: Transnational Prostitution in Colonial British West Africa,” Journal of the History of Sexuality 24, no.1 (2015): 99–124.

• “O! Sir I Do Not Know Either to Kill Myself or to Stay”: Childhood Emotion, Poverty, and Literary Culture in Nigeria, 1900–1960,” Journal of the History of Childhood and Youth 8, no.2 (2015): 273–294.

• “Where is the Boundary? Cocoa Conflict, Land Tenure, and Politics in Western Nigeria,” Journal of Social History 47, no.1 (2013), 176–195. 
 
• “‘The Problem of Nigeria is Slavery, Not White Slave Traffic’: Globalization and the Politicization of Prostitution in Southern Nigeria, 1921–1955,” Canadian Journal of African Studies 46, no.1 (2012): 1–22.

• “Of Gender, Race, and Class: The Politics of Prostitution in Lagos, Nigeria, 1923–1954,” Frontiers: A Journal of Women’s Studies 33, no. 3 (2012):71–92.

• “Dangerous Aphrodisiac, Restless Sexuality: Venereal Disease, Biomedicine, and Protectionism in Colonial Lagos, Nigeria,” Journal of Colonialism and Colonial History 13.3 (2012).

• “Researching Colonial Childhoods: Images and Representations of Children in Nigerian Newspaper Press, 1925–1950,” History in Africa: A Journal of Method 39 (2012): 241–266.

References 

Living people
21st-century Nigerian historians
Writers from Ibadan
University of Ibadan alumni
English-language writers from Nigeria
Yoruba historians
1979 births
Western Carolina University faculty